The Outer Ring Road is a  long ring road expressway under construction, encircling the city of Warangal, Telangana, India.

History 
The foundation of the expressway was laid by the Chief Minister of Telangana, K. Chandrashekar Rao in October 2017. NHAI took up the construction of  stretch which would act as a bypass of National Highway 163 while the remaining  would be constructed by R&B. The total estimated cost of the project is 7 billion.

Progress 
As of March 2020, construction of. NH bypass stretch of the expressway is completed.

References

External links

Proposed roads in India
Transport in Warangal